Zelin is a surname. Notable people with the surname include:

Alexander Zelin (born 1953), Russian Air Force colonel-general
Madeleine Zelin, American sinologist
Steven Zelin, American singer-songwriter

There are also some places named Zelin:
Zelin, a town in Echeng District, Ezhou, Hubei, China